Jonathan L. Halperin (born January 29, 1949) is an American cardiologist and the author of Bypass, among the most comprehensive works on the subject of coronary artery bypass surgery. In addition, he is the Robert and Harriet Heilbrunn Professor of Medicine at The Mount Sinai School of Medicine as well as Director of Clinical Cardiology in the Zena and Michael A. Wierner Cardiovascular Institute at The Mount Sinai Medical Center, both in New York City. Halperin was the principal cardiologist responsible for both the design and execution of the multi-center Stroke Prevention in Atrial Fibrillation (SPAF) clinical trials, funded by the National Institutes of Health, which helped develop antithrombotic strategies to prevent stroke, and he subsequently directed the SPORTIF clinical trials, which evaluated the first oral direct thrombin inhibitor for prevention of stroke in patients with atrial fibrillation.

Halperin is the author of 3 books, 80 original peer reviewed reports, 38 chapters, 24 guidelines and position statements, 51 invited articles and 58 abstracts. He is listed among New York Magazine’s Best Doctors of 2009.

Biography
Halperin was born in 1949 in Boston, Massachusetts. He earned his A.B. from Columbia University in 1971 and his M.D. from Boston University in 1975. He completed an internship in medicine (in 1976) and a residency in internal medicine (in 1977), both at University Hospital, Boston. He was a clinical and research fellow in peripheral vascular disease at the Evans Memorial Foundation for Clinical Research in Boston (1977–1978) and a fellow in cardiology at Boston City Hospital (1978–1980). He served academic appointments at Boston City Hospital, St. Elizabeth's Hospital in Brighton, Massachusetts, Boston University School of Medicine and the American Heart Association. In 1980, Halperin was appointed to The Mount Sinai School of Medicine as an Assistant Professor of Medicine. In 1993, he was named the Robert and Harriet Heilbrunn Professor of Medicine.

Halperin is a fellow of the American College of Cardiology, the American Heart Association, and the Councils on Circulation, Stroke and Cardiology of the American Heart Association. He is past president of the Society for Vascular Medicine.

Current federal appointments include the U.S Food and Drug Administration’s Cardiovascular and Renal Advisory Committee, and the Data Safety Monitoring Board for the Clinical Trial of Aspirin and Simvastatin in Pulmonary Arterial Hypertension for the National Institutes of Health.

Clinical investigation topics include congestive heart failure, Raynaud's disease and mitral valve disease.

Honors and awards
Extramural honors and awards include:
Master of the Society for Vascular Medicine, 2009
The Heart of New York Award, 2005
The Heart of New York Presidential Salute, 2002
Howard B. Sprague Research Fellowship Award, 1979

Books
Halperin JL, Levine R: BYPASS: A Cardiologist Reveals What Every Patient Needs To Know. New York: Times Books – Random House, 1985 ; Phoenix: The Body Press – HP Books, 1987 
Gross PA, Halperin JL, Lipkin M, Marks JH, Rivlin RS, Wise TN, Grzelka C: Managing Your Health: Strategies for Lifelong Good Health. Yonkers, NY: Consumer Reports Books, 1991. 
Connolly SJ, Gore JL, Halperin JL. Aligning Clinical Practice with Evidence for Prevention of Thromboembolism in Atrial Fibrillation. Institute for Continuing Healthcare Education, 2002.

Publications
Partial list:

References

External links
Mount Sinai Hospital homepage
Icahn School of Medicine at Mount Sinai homepage
TheHeart.org Kowey PR, Halperin JL, Yusuf S. Trial Design for Anticoagulation in Atrial Fibrillation Patients. American College of Cardiology Annual Scientific Sessions, March 30, 2009
New York Daily News A Mount Sinai cardiologist makes sure your heart's in the right place. By Katie Charles, February 13, 2008

1949 births
American cardiologists
Boston University School of Medicine alumni
Columbia University alumni
Living people
Icahn School of Medicine at Mount Sinai faculty
People from Boston
Fellows of the American College of Cardiology